Psoralea vanberkelae is a species of legume in the family Fabaceae. It is found in South Africa.

References

Psoraleeae
Flora of South Africa
Data deficient plants